Rahul Singh is an Indian actor, playwright and screenwriter.

Early life and background
He is the son of Prabha Thakur, poet and a member of Rajya Sabha. Singh attended school at Mayo College in Ajmer and graduated from St. Xavier's College. While in college, he wrote more than 50 street plays and was part of an acting group that performed for various social organisations.

Career
In 2001, Singh appeared in the film Zubeidaa. He also wrote dialogues for Bollywood film Kaante (2002). In 2009, he appeared in Jail.

Singh currently plays the lead role of Brij Bhushan in the TV serial Sapno Ke Bhanwar Mein.
 He is also acting as Vikrant Maharia as a negative role in [[24 (Indian TV series)|24]] .

Singh has written and acted in stage plays for the Jagrut theatre group, which he founded. He has directed and acted in nearly fifty stage plays fostering awareness for rising social issues.

He has also performed in cultural festivals including Mood Indigo, and Malhar. Rahul has performed in The Shawl by David Mamet, Hamlet and The Merchant of Venice by Shakespeare, and The Black Cat by Edgar Allan Poe, among others. He has also performed in several classical and modern plays for the English theatre and Hindi theatre in the Oval House Theatre.

Filmography

Writing credits

Acting Credits

Films

Television

References

External links
 
 

1966 births
Living people
Male actors from Rajasthan
People from Udaipur
Male actors in Hindi cinema